The Two Faces of Fear is a film directed by Tulio Demicheli. The film is an Italian and Spanish co-production between the Rome based company B.R.C. and Tecisa a Madrid based company.

Cast
 George Hilton as Dr. Roberto Carli
 Fernando Rey as Inspector Nardi 
 Luciana Paluzzi as  Elena Carli 
 Anita Strindberg as  Dr. Paola Lombardi 
 Manuel Zarzo as  Félix, Nardi's assistant 
 Luis Dávila as  Dr. Michele Azzini 
 Eduardo Fajardo as  Luisi 
 Antonio del Real as  Dr. Michele Azzini  
 Teresa Guayda González as  Maria

Release
The Two Faces of Fear was distributed in Spain on 24 March 1972. It grossed a contemporary value of 81,001.29 Euro with admissions of 396,942 in Spain.

Reception
From contemporary reviews, David McGillivray reviewed an 88 minute dubbed version in the Monthly Film Bulletin. McGillivray stated that "Apart from one taut and reasonably well played sequence in which a woman-convinced that her husband is about to murder her on the operating table-pleads for understanding as she succumbs to the anaesthetic, this routine and underdeveloped thriller consists of little more than bits of badly tied wrapping." McGillivray also stated that the film had "expressionless dubbing".

References

External links

1972 films
1970s thriller films
Giallo films
Films directed by Tulio Demicheli
Films scored by Franco Micalizzi
Spanish thriller films
1970s Italian films
1970s Spanish films